Scrape, scraper or scraping may refer to:

Biology and medicine
 Abrasion (medical), a type of injury
 Scraper (biology), grazer-scraper, a water animal that feeds on stones and other substrates by grazing algae, microorganism and other matter
 Scrape, a depression in the ground, bare of soil, which is used as a bird nest
 Cloud scraper, birds of the genus Cisticola
 scrapers, a group of cyprinid fish in the genus Capoeta

Computing
 Data scraping, a technique in which a computer program extracts data from human-readable output coming from another program
 Screen scraping, a method through which a program captures information from a display not intended for processing by computers
 Web scraping, extracting information from a website, for analysis or reuse, most effectively by a web crawler
 Tracker scrape, request sent to a BitTorrent tracker
 Scraper site, a website created by web scraping
 Blog scraping, the process of scanning through a large number of blogs, searching for and copying content

Hand tools
 Scraper (archaeology), a stone tool
 Scraper (kitchen), a cooking tool
 Card scraper, cabinet scraper or scraper, a tool for scraping wood
 Hand scraper, a single-edged tool used to scrape metal from a surface
 Ice scraper, a handheld tool for removing frost, ice, and snow from windows
 Paint scraper, a hand tool to remove paint or other coatings from a substrate

Machines
 Fresno scraper, powered by an external tractor which pulls it
 Wheel tractor-scraper, a piece of heavy equipment used for earth-moving

Music and audio
 Rake and scrape, a type of Caribbean music
 Scrape flutter, in sound recording, high-frequency flutter over 100 Hz

In instruments or implements
 Scraper (instrument), a musical instrument
 Pick slide, also called pick scrape, an electric guitar playing/sound effect technique
 Gourd scraper, also called a pua, a stick used for playing the güiro, an instrument consisting of a hollow gourd

In works
 "Scrape" (Blue Stahli song), a 2009 non-album single by Blue Stahli
 "Scrape", a 2017 song by Chelsea Wolfe from Hiss Spun
 "Scrape", a 2017 song by Future from his self-titled album
 "Scrape", a 2010 song by Kurupt from Streetlights
 Scraping (album), a 2002 rock music album by Calexico

Other
 Boot scraper, an item of ironmongery used to scrape mud off boots
 Scraper bike, a bicycle that has been modified by its owner
 Scraper (car), a modified American-made family car characterized by large rims and extensive personalization
 Scratchboard, also called a scraperboard, where drawings are created using sharp tools for etching into a thin layer of clay
 Skyscraper, a building over 40 stories tall
 Sparrowhawk, Oklahoma, a census-designated place once known as "Scraper" in Cherokee County, Oklahoma, United States

See also
 Scrap
 Scrapie
 Skraypers